AmaZulu: The Children of Heaven is a 2006 British documentary film directed by Hannan Majid and Richard York. The film follows seven teenagers in a township in Umlazi as they come together to learn under the leadership of headmaster, Mr. Mtshali at Velabahleke High School.

Summary
The film show life in the South African township of Durban's Umlazi through seven pupils of Velabahleke High School, Velabahleke ("Come with a Smile"), as they come together under their headmaster Mr Mtshali.

The aspirations and everyday lives of the pupils, both in and out of school, interweave to form a story of a generation striving to transcend their disadvantaged backgrounds, hope and dream of a new purpose-driven life, and aspire to achieve their goals.

Appearances
Cindy Cele
Nonhlanhla Mtshali
Zakhele Khuzwayo
Thembi Mlabo
Nkosinathi Mgiyako
Nkosinathi Hadebe
Sbonelo Dladla
Mbongeni Mtshali

Development
AmaZulu was financed by The Northern Film Foundation and Leeds Metropolitan University. The film's directors, Richard York and Hannan Majid, said that the purpose of the film was "To raise awareness and help in the eradication of social injustice across the world through the power of film."

Release
AmaZulu premiered at the Durban International Film Festival in June 2006. It also participated at the Cape Town International Film Festival 2006, Closing Film Cambridge African Film Festival 2006, Zithengi Film Market 2006, Aljazeera International Documentary Film Festival 2007, SABC Africa on Screen Film Festival 2007, Medimed 2007 and Mosaiques International Film Festival 2010.

The South African government screened the film to teachers around the country and it was also shown in the Tower Hamlets borough in London.

Reception
Debbie Myburg of The South African described AmaZulu as "a moving and compelling narrative, an interweaving of different stories showing a generation striving to achieve what could be theirs in a new South Africa." Rasha Mohammad of OnIslam said, "With their seven young heroes, they render through the screen how children are struggling there, surrounded by poverty and apartheid, facing a world of madness where words, ideas, and policies are twisted so they do not know what the truth actually is."

Durban International Film Festival said, "Amazulu is a powerful and inspiring narrative".

Awards and nominations

See also
Bafana
Education in South Africa

References

External links 

2006 films
2006 documentary films
British documentary films
British independent films
Zulu-language films
Documentary films about South Africa
Documentary films about high school
Rainbow Collective films
Films shot in South Africa
Films directed by Hannan Majid
2006 independent films
2000s English-language films
2000s British films